Harry Brightmore (born 1 July 1994) is a British coxswain.  He won the 2022 world championship title in the British men's eight after earlier winning gold that season at the 2022 European Rowing Championships.

References

External links

1994 births
Living people
British male rowers
Coxswains (rowing)
World Rowing Championships medalists for Great Britain
21st-century British people